Nihal Sarin (born 13 July 2004) is an Indian chess player and chess prodigy. He achieved the title of Grandmaster at age 14. In 2018, he passed the Elo rating of 2600 at 14 years old, which at the time made him the third youngest player in history to do so.

As a junior player, Nihal was the World Under-10 champion in 2014. In 2015, he tied for first place in the World Under-12 championship, taking the silver medal on tiebreaks. Nihal won the Gold Medal as part of the Indian team in the FIDE Online Chess Olympiad 2020. He won the U-18 World Youth Championship held online in rapid format in 2020.

Early childhood
Nihal was born on 13 July 2004 in Thrissur, Kerala, India. Sarin Abdulsalam, Nihal's father, is a dermatologist while his mother, Shijin Ammanam Veetil Ummar, is a psychiatrist. He has a younger sister, Neha. His family spent their first few years in Kottayam.

He could recognize the capitals and the flags of 190 countries by the age of three. At the same age, he also had managed to know and recite from memory the scientific names of insects and plants. By the time he was in upper kindergarten, he spoke fluent English, and by the age of six, having just enrolled into the first grade, he knew all the multiplication tables until sixteen.

Nihal began learning chess at the age of six. In order for his son to not feel bored during school vacations, his father introduced Nihal to a chess set, and his grandfather A. A. Ummar taught him the rules at Kottayam, where he was a student of Excelsior English School. Nihal's first coach was Mathew P. Joseph Pottoore, the school's chess coach who instructed him twice a week in the beginning and then gave Sarin special individual classes.

In 2011, Nihal and his family returned to Thrissur where Nihal joined Devamatha CMI Public School.

Junior career 
Nihal won the Kerala State Championship in the Under-07 category in 2011, the Under-09 title twice, the Under-11 title twice and Under-15 title once. He became runner-up in 2015 State Senior championship in Irinjalakuda at the age of 10 years, thus becoming eligible to represent Kerala in the 2015 National Challengers Championship. He was twice the State Under-19 Runner-up at the age of 8 and 10 years, respectively.

Nihal was the 2013 National Under-9 Champion in Chennai, the 2014 National Under-11 Bronze medalist at Puri, and the National Under-11 Silver medalist, 2015 in Pondicherry.

Nihal won the gold medal in the World Blitz Championship in the Under-10 category in Al-Ain in 2013. In the same category, he was the Rapid and Blitz gold medalist in the Asian Youth Championship in Tashkent in 2014.

At the age of 10 at Thodupuzha, Kerala, Nihal played simultaneously against 112 players of all age categories and won all his games.

At the end of 2013, Nihal began working with Ukrainian GM Dimitri Komarov, an experienced coach with international success in his playing days, whom he met by accident at a tournament while Komarov was coaching the United Arab Emirates team. Dimitri would go on to coach Nihal for several years.

2014-2016: World Youth Championship and IM title

Nihal's first big break came at the World Youth Chess Championship in the Under-10 category, which was held in Durban, South Africa in September 2014. He scored 9/11 to be crowned the Under-10 World Champion. For this achievement, he was conferred the Candidate Master (CM) title by FIDE.

Right after his World Youth success in 2014, Nihal scored his first victory over a titled player, IM Jonathan Westerberg of Sweden, at the World Junior Championship 2014 in Pune, India. For a year, Nihal was a regular in all the tournaments of importance held in India, including the National Challengers Championship in Nagpur. He would regularly hold titled players to draws.

The next year in 2015, he won the silver medal in the Under-12 category of World Youth Chess Championship in Greece. In the last rounds of the tournament, Nihal successively defeated the top two seeds of his category: IM Awonder Liang and FM Nodirbek Abdusattorov. He was conferred the FIDE Master (FM) title by the World chess Federation in the same year as he had crossed live Elo rating of 2300.

He was a guest competitor in the Malayalam TV quiz show Aswamedham in March 2015.

In the 2016 edition of the tournament held in Batumi, Georgia, Nihal scored 8½/11 and tied for the second spot with three others. He was fourth on tiebreak.

In February 2016, Nihal played his first International Open outside India, the Cappelle-la-Grande Open, and registered his first International Master norm. In the process, he defeated a grandmaster for the first time in his career.

In Hasselbacken Open 2016 held at the turn of April in Stockholm, Nihal beat Lithuanian grandmaster Eduardas Rozentalis. The database website Chess-DB dubbed this performance as the 'Game of the Day'.

On Children's Day in 2016,  Nihal was chosen as one of the recipients of 'National Child Award For Exceptional Achievement' awarded by the former President of India Pranab Mukherjee.

At the Sunway Sitges Open 2016, Nihal registered his second International Master norm by scoring 5½/9. His third International Norm was registered in the Aeroflot B Open 2017 held in February, where Nihal scored 5½/9 as well, performing at 2539, to cross the 2400-mark and become an International Master.

2017-2020: GM title
At the World Youth Chess Olympiad in December 2017, Nihal played for India Green, helping the country secure a silver medal. He also won an individual gold.

At the TV2 Fagernes International 2017, Nihal tied for the second place to finish with 6.0/9. He was fourth on the tiebreak and stayed undefeated throughout the tournament. In the process, he scored his maiden Grand Master norm. In 2017, Nihal increased his rating by 192 elo points to cross 2500 in rating.

At Reykjavik Open 2018 held in March, Nihal scored 6.0/9 with a rating performance of 2668 to score his second GM norm. He scored wins against grandmasters Ahmed Adly and Elshan Moradiabadi and drew with Richard Rapport, Gata Kamsky and Mustafa Yilmaz.

Nihal made his debut at the Isbank Turkish Super League in July 2018, leading the team Genc Akademisyenler on the first board. He scored 6.0/12 against an opposition made up of an average rating of 2590.

At the Abu Dhabi Masters 2018 held in August, Nihal tallied 5½/9 with a rating performance of 2626 to secure his third GM norm. He became the 53rd grandmaster of India and the twelfth youngest in history at the time. On the day Nihal had become a grandmaster, his home state Kerala was ravaged by the 2018 Kerala floods, the biggest natural disaster in the state's history. Nihal contributed by raising Rs. 174,463/- (approximately US$2500) via a live YouTube show hosted by Indian chess news portal ChessBase India.

Nihal competed in the Tata Steel Rapid Championship 2018. Starting as the last seed, Nihal scored 3.0/9, with draws against Viswanathan Anand, Shakhriyar Mamedyarov, Sergey Karjakin, Pentala Harikrishna, Vidit Gujrathi, and Surya Shekhar Ganguly, losing only three games to Hikaru Nakamura, Levon Aronian, and Wesley So. The event marked Nihal's first game against the legendary five-time world champion Anand who graciously commented after the game, "Going by the evidence so far, I would not rule it out (Nihal becoming a world champion in future). It’s a long journey forward. At the end, he is just 14. I felt that he would really struggle in this tournament and he would be a bit out of place. It seemed the opposite. He seemed quite comfortable here. Not fully there, but he’s a huge talent what I’ve seen of him." Anand was quoted as saying by PTI.

Nihal ended 2018 at the World Blitz Championship in Saint Petersburg, Russia where he scored 13½/21 with a rating performance of 2777, taking the 11th place on tiebreak.

In the 2019 TePe Sigeman & Co. Masters tournament held in Malmo, Sweden, Nihal scored a 3.0/7 and finished 6th place to cross the 2600 Elo mark in rating. He was the third youngest player in history and the youngest Indian to do so at the time. At the 2019 French Team Chess Championship, Nihal scored 6.0/11 on the first board and helped Mulhouse Philidor finish a historic third place. In 2019, aged 15, Nihal had become the youngest Indian to play in the World Cup 2019 where he managed to reach the second round after beating Peruvian Jorge Cori 2–0 in the first round. In the second round, Nihal beat Azeri GM Eltaj Safarli. Nihal lost the second round and the tiebreakers to crash out of the tournament.

Since 2019, Nihal is sponsored by Akshayakalpa, an Indian Organic Milk Company.

In January 2020, Nihal competed in the Tata Steel Challengers tournament and scored 7.0/13 to share the sixth spot. Nihal was a part of the Indian Chess Team that won the FIDE Online Chess Olympiad 2020.

After the Online Chess Olympiad 2020, Nihal's run of wins continued with him winning the Junior Speed Chess Championship conducted by Chess.com. A few weeks later he went to win the Capechecs Online Trophy in October 2020. He also helped the Indian team win the silver medal at the Asian Teams Online Championship 2020. On 10 December, Nihal registered his third successful win by defeating Arjun Erigaisi in the finals of the Super Juniors Cup organized by Chessbase India. His fourth tournament win for the year 2020 came after he defeated GM Shant Sargsyan of Armenia in the finals of the World Youth Chess Championship 2020 held online and organized by FIDE. He was crowned under-18 World Youth Chess Champion on 22 December 2020, and won the Gazprom Brilliancy Prize for his game against IM Francesco Sonis.

Nihal won the World Online Youth Championships 2020 in the Under-18 category by defeating GM Shant Sargsyan from Armenia.

2021
In April 2021, Nihal participated in the Julius Baer Challengers Chess Tour, becoming one of 19 young chess players who were selected to receive training sessions from Judit Polgár and Vladimir Kramnik as well as participating in a number of head-to-head games against various grandmasters. On 19 April 2021, the 19 participants faced off against current world champion Magnus Carlsen in a Blitz format with 3 minutes being allotted per move with no time increment. Nihal was among two of the 19 participants who were able to defeat Carlsen in the event. This game marked Nihal's first victory against the world champion in an official event. Nihal had previously beaten Carlsen in an unofficial online Blitz game on 27 May 2020, prompting the world champion to remark that Nihal was "one of the young guns" and "one of the better blitz players around".

In June 2021, playing the Silver Lake Open in Serbia, his first over the board tournament since the onset of the COVID-19 pandemic, Nihal Scored 8.0/9 with a 2807 rating performance to take first place. In July 2021, Nihal won his second consecutive tournament by winning the Serbia Open Masters in Belgrade with 7.5/9 and a rating performance of 2786.

In October 2021, Nihal defeated Raunak Sadhwani to win the Junior Speed Chess Championship organized by Chess.com.

Adult career

2022-2023: Peak ranking
Nihal achieved his peak ranking of world No. 63 and peak rating of 2677 in September 2022.

He lost to Hikaru Nakamura in the semifinals of the 2022 Speed Chess Championship.

Training 
Nihal's first coach was Mathew P. Joseph Pottoore, a chess coach at his school. Nirmal E P, the Kerala State Champion, started training Nihal when he was eight years old.

He was trained by Dimitri Komarov from 2013 to 2019. He has been working with Srinath Narayanan since 2016. Since late 2020, Nihal is also trained by Viswanathan Anand as part of the WestBridge-Anand Chess Academy.

See also

References

External links
 
 
 

2004 births
Living people
Chess grandmasters
Indian chess players
Sportspeople from Thrissur
Malayali people